ReDhoom is the sixth album of the Indian rock band Euphoria and is the second remixed album in the Dhoom (the first being Phir Dhoom after the main Dhoom).

Track list
 Bhoola Sab
 Dhoom (Feat. Shubha Mudgal)
 Tum
 Rok Sako To Rok Lo
 Maeri
 Phir Dhoom
 Hind Rock
 Sha Nananana
 Me & You
 Bewafaa
 Soneya
 Mehfuz
 Bhoola Sab - The Forgot Mix

2008 albums
Euphoria (Indian band) albums